This is the discography of British pop duo Peter and Gordon.

Albums

Studio albums

Compilation albums

EPs

Singles

Notes

References

External links

Discographies of British artists
Pop music group discographies